Gamka River is a river located in the Western Cape, South Africa. The name '' means 'Lion' and was probably named so by the San people (Bushmen). The river originates north of Beaufort West, generally flowing southwest towards the Gamkapoort Dam.

The main tributaries of the Gamka River, are the Dwyka River, Koekemoers River and Leeuw River which rise in the Great Karoo, converge and flow southwards through the Swartberg Mountains. The Olifants River joins the Gamka River south of Calitzdorp. Together these become the Gourits River.

The Gamka River flows from the North East of the Gamka Dam and the Dwyka River from the North West. Both rivers flow into the Gamka Dam from there the Gamka river flows south and becomes the Gourits River at Calitzdorp, where it flows past the similarly named mountains Gamkaberg.

Dams in the Gamka River 
 Doornfontein Dam (capacity ),
 Gamka Dam (capacity ),
 Springfontein Dam,
 Leeu-Gamka Dam (capacity ),
 Gamkapoort Dam (capacity ),
 Oukloof Dam (capacity ),
 Calitzdorp Dam (capacity ),
 Tierkloof Dam (capacity )

See also 
 List of rivers of South Africa
 List of reservoirs and dams in South Africa

References 

Rivers of the Western Cape